Bruce Haywood (30 September 1925 – 7 January 2020) was an English-born American academic, who served as a professor of German language and literature, dean and provost of Kenyon College and was president of Monmouth College in Illinois. He died in January 2020 at the age of 94.

Early life and education
Born in York, England in 1925, Haywood was raised in Allerton Bywater, Yorkshire. Haywood served with British Army intelligence corps near Bremerhaven in northern Germany for twenty-seven months at the end of World War II, then attended the University of Leeds. He then went on to McGill University, where he studied under Willem Graff for his bachelor's and master's degrees in 1950. He then moved on to Harvard University, where he completed his doctorate under Stuart Atkins in 1956 with a thesis on "A study of imagery in the works of Novalis."

Academic career
From 1954 to 1963, Haywood served as a professor of German language and literature at Kenyon College, after having been recruited by the school's president, Gordon Keith Chalmers. From 1963 to 1980, he served as Kenyon's dean and provost, and was later appointed as the tenth president of Monmouth College, a position he held until 1994.

Published works

 Novalis, the veil of imagery; a study of the poetic works of Friedrich von Hardenberg, 1772–1801 's-Gravenhage: Mouton, 1959; Cambridge, Mass.: Harvard University Press, 1959.
 The Essential College, Gambier, OH: XOXOX Press, 2006
 Allerton Bywater: A Yorkshire Boyhood, Gambier, OH: XOXOX Press, 2007
  Bremerhaven: A Memoir of Germany, 1945–1947, Nantucket, MA: EditAndPublishYourBook.com/ Lulu; 1st edition (21 September 2010)

Sources

People from Allerton Bywater
1925 births
2020 deaths
English emigrants to the United States
McGill University alumni
Harvard University alumni
Germanists
Kenyon College faculty
Presidents of Monmouth College
Intelligence Corps officers